Rezaabad (also Romanized as Reẕāābād) is a village in Nurabad Rural District, in the Central District of Delfan County, Lorestan Province, Iran. At the 2006 census, its population was 266, in 61 families.

References 

Towns and villages in Delfan County